Mario Borroto was a professional baseball catcher in the Negro leagues. He played with Cuban Stars (East) in 1920 and 1921.

References

External links
  and Seamheads

Year of birth missing
Year of death missing
Cuban Stars (East) players
Baseball catchers